"Chic Mystique" is a 1992 song by American disco and R&B act Chic. Written and produced by guitarist Nile Rodgers and bass-player Bernard Edwards, it was the second single from the album Chic-Ism and was a number-one hit on the Billboard Hot Dance Club Play in the US. It didn't reach the Billboard Hot 100 but achieved moderate success in many European countries where it was a top 25 hit.

Track listings

 CD single / 7" single
 "Chic Mystique" – 4:04
 "Chic Mystique" (lovely radio edit w/out rap) – 4:42

 CD maxi
 "Chic Mystique" (single without rap) – 4:04
 "Chic Mystique" (lovely radio edit without rap) – 4:42
 "Chic Mystique" (4 AM mix) – 7:03
 "Chic Mystique" (album version) – 6:40
 "Chic Mystique" (club mix) – 7:59
 "Chic Mystique" (lovely club mix) – 6:46
 "Chic Mystique" (bonus accapella) – 1:24

 CD maxi
 "Chic Mystique" (single version)
 "Chic Mystique" (club mix)
 "Chic Mystique" (brothers in rhythm 12" mix)
 "Chic Mystique" (reprise album version)
 "Chic Mystique" (lovely club mix)
 "Chic Mystique" (4 AM mix)
 "Chic Mystique" (12" remix extended album version)
 "Chic Mystique" (taramasalta and jam dub)
 "Chic Mystique" (club dub)

 12" maxi
 "Chic Mystique" (album version) – 6:40
 "Chic Mystique" (4 AM mix) – 7:03
 "Chic Mystique" (brothers in rhythm 12" mix) – 7:41
 "Chic Mystique" (club mix) – 7:59
 "Chic Mystique" (lovely club mix) – 6:46

 12" maxi
 "Chic Mystique" (club mix) – 7:59
 "Chic Mystique" (club dub) – 8:06
 "Chic Mystique" (bonus a cappella) – 1:24
 "Chic Mystique" (12" remix extended album version) (6:50
 "Chic Mystique" (lovely club mix) – 6:46
 "Chic Mystique" (4 AM mix) – 7:03

Credits
 Engineered by Doug DeAngelis
 Keyboards by James Preston
 Mixed by Doug DeAngelis and Roger S.
 Remixed by Roger S.
 Saxophone by Deji Coker
 Backing vocals by Robin Clark and Fonzi Thornton

Charts

Cover and sample versions
The lyrics were used in Manix's 2013 song "Rave Fantasy", which is where the title came from.

References

1992 singles
Chic (band) songs
Songs written by Nile Rodgers
Songs written by Bernard Edwards
Song recordings produced by Nile Rodgers
1992 songs
Warner Records singles